Okulovskaya is a rural locality (a village) and the administrative center of Vyyskoye Rural Settlement of Verkhnetoyemsky District, Arkhangelsk Oblast, Russia. The population was 124 as of 2010.

Geography 
Okulovskaya is located on the Vya River, 184 km northeast of Verkhnyaya Toyma (the district's administrative centre) by road. Stepanovskaya is the nearest rural locality.

References 

Rural localities in Verkhnetoyemsky District